Burkholderia diffusa is a gram-negative, aerobic, non-spore-forming bacterium from the genus of Burkholderia and the family of Burkholderiaceae which belongs to the Burkholderia cepacia complex.

References

External links
Type strain of Burkholderia diffusa at BacDive -  the Bacterial Diversity Metadatabase

Burkholderiaceae
Bacteria described in 2008